Golem is a rock-klezmer band from New York City. They mix traditional Eastern European Jewish music with original material sung in Yiddish, English, Russian, as well as Ukrainian, French, Serbo-Croatian, and Romany.

Golem was created in November, 2000 by Annette Ezekiel Kogan, bandleader, vocalist and accordionist. The group describes itself as "Eastern European Jewish folk-rock". The group performs internationally throughout the United States, Canada, Mexico, as well as France, Germany, Ukraine, the U.K, Poland and Sweden.

Biography
Annette Ezekiel Kogan formed Golem in 2000. Before even putting the band together she contacted David Krakauer, who was then curating the weekly "Klezmer Brunch" at the downtown venue Tonic, and asked him for a gig. Krakauer agreed, and Ezekiel Kogan put together the first lineup for Golem’s debut.

Golem recorded its first EP Golem in 2001, followed by the self-produced full-length albums Libeshmertzn (Love Hurts) (2002) and Homesick Songs (2004).

In June, 2005, Golem recreated a "mock wedding", based on an old Catskills’ tradition, at the Knitting Factory in New York. An entire Jewish wedding ceremony took place before 200 "guests", complete with rabbi, chuppah, wedding party, and bride and groom in drag. The event was featured on the front page of the NY Times Arts section.

Golem’s music continued to evolve, moving from reinterpretations of traditional songs to more and more original material.

In 2005, Golem signed with the NY indie label, Jdub Records (which launched the career of Matisyahu) and remained with Jdub until the label closed in 2011. Golem released two albums on Jdub : Fresh Off Boat (2006) and Citizen Boris (2009), both produced by Emery Dobyns (Patti Smith, Antony and the Johnsons).

Numerous guest artists participated in Golem’s recordings, including Amanda Palmer, Lenny Kaye, Mike Gordon and Brandon Seabrook.

In June, 2014, Golem released the album Tanz, produced by Tony Maimone (Pere Ubu) on the Mexican world music label, Discos Corasón (Buena Vista Social Club).

Golem performed live on an episode of Season 4 of Louis CK’s acclaimed television comedy, Louie, in June 2014. In 2017 Golem performed live on VICELAND show The Untitled Action Bronson Show. In 2020 Golem was a featured in S1E7 of Amazon's Hunters and S1E4 of Netflix' Dash & Lily.

Golem performs in rock clubs, festivals, theaters, as well as at private events.

Influences and genres
Golem combines elements of rock, punk, and klezmer. Lyrics are mainly in English, Yiddish and Russian. Golem’s music is an undefinable hybrid characterized by a relentless beat and intense, theatrical energy.

Meaning of the name "Golem"
The band's name refers to the golem, a legendary monster figure from the Talmud and Jewish folklore, a being created out of clay by mystical rabbis in order to protect the endangered Jewish community, but who, when out of control, was turned back into clay. The band Golem describes itself as a collective monster that treats traditional Jewish Eastern European music with the utmost respect but without timidity or resistance to change.

Discography

Studio albums
 Golem (debut EP) (2001)
 Libeshmertzn (Love Hurts) (2002)
 Homesick Songs (2004)
 Fresh Off Boat (2006)
 Citizen Boris (2009)
 Tanz (2014)

Music videos
 "Warsaw is Khelm" (2006)
 "Charlatan-Ka" (2008)
 "Freydele" (2014)
 "Chervona Ruta" (2015)
 "Vodka Is Poison" (2016)

Compilations and soundtracks
 Ukraine do Amerika (2008)
 Generation P (2011)
 Russendisko (2012)
 Putumayo’s A Jewish Celebration (2013)

References

External links
Official site.
NPR's Fresh Air: Review of Tanz
Robert Christgau's review of Tanz 
Jazz Weekly: Review, Golem Tanz
Tablet: Klezmer Band Golem to Appear on ‘Louie’
"Warsaw is Khelm" artist commentary 
Klezmershack: Review of Homesick Songs
Blender: Review of Citizen Boris
News story on Voice of America, Ukrainian Service
Report in "Window On America" (Voice of America, Ukrainian Service)

Musical groups from New York (state)
Gypsy punk groups
Klezmer groups
Yiddish culture in New York City
Jewish rock groups
Jewish folk rock groups
Jewish punk rock groups
Musical groups established in 2000
2000 establishments in New York (state)